Year 175 (CLXXV) was a common year starting on Saturday (link will display the full calendar) of the Julian calendar. At the time, it was known as the Year of the Consulship of Piso and Iulianus (or, less frequently, year 928 Ab urbe condita). The denomination 175 for this year has been used since the early medieval period, when the Anno Domini calendar era became the prevalent method in Europe for naming years.

Events 
 By place 
 Roman Empire 
 Marcus Aurelius suppresses a revolt of Avidius Cassius, governor of Syria, after the latter proclaims himself emperor. 
 Avidius Cassius fails in seeking support for his rebellion and is assassinated by Roman officers. They send his head to Aurelius, who persuades the Senate to pardon Cassius's family.
 Commodus, son of Marcus Aurelius and his wife Faustina, is named Caesar. 
 M. Sattonius Iucundus, decurio in Colonia Ulpia Traiana, restores the Thermae of Coriovallum (modern Heerlen) there are sources that state this happened in the 3rd century.

 Asia 
 Confucian scholars try to ensure their capacity in the royal court of China.  They are massacred by the eunuchs.

 By topic 
 Religion 
 Pope Eleuterus succeeds Pope Soter as the thirteenth pope (approximate date).

Births 
 Ammonius Saccas, Egyptian philosopher (d. 242)
 Pope Pontian (approximate date) of the Catholic Church (d. 235)
 Sun Ce, Chinese general, warlord (d. 200)
 Yang Xiu, Chinese official, adviser (d. 219)
 Zhou Yu, Chinese general, strategist (d. 210)

Deaths 
 January 14 – Pontianus of Spoleto, Christian martyr (b. 156)
 Avidius Cassius, Roman general, usurper (b. AD 130)
 Concordius of Spoleto, Christian martyr (approximate date)
 Faustina the Younger, Roman empress (b. AD 130)
 Vettius Valens, Greek astrologer, writer (b. AD 120)

References